

Forthhere (or Fordhere) was a medieval Bishop of Sherborne.

Forthhere was consecrated in 709. He died about 737, possibly resigning before he died.

The Anglo-Saxon Chronicle for the year 737 reports that he undertook a pilgrimage to Rome along with Queen Frithugyth.

Citations

References

External links
 

Year of birth unknown
Bishops of Sherborne (ancient)
8th-century deaths
8th-century English bishops